An underscore or underline is a line drawn under a segment of text. In proofreading, underscoring is a convention that says "set this text in italic type", traditionally used on manuscript or typescript as an instruction to the printer. Its use to add emphasis in modern documents is a deprecated practice.

The underscore character, also called a low line, or low dash, originally appeared on the typewriter so that underscores could be typed. To produce an underscored word, the word was typed, the typewriter carriage was moved back to the beginning of the word, and the word was overtyped with the underscore character.

In modern usage, underscoring is achieved by markup or with the Unicode combining low line. The underscore character is used in strings where spaces are not permitted to create visual spacing, such as in computer filenames, email addresses, and in Internet URLs, for example .

Diacritic

The underscore is used as a diacritic mark, "combining low line", in some languages of Egypt, some languages using the Rapidolangue orthography in Gabon, Izere in Nigeria, and indigenous languages of the Americas such as Shoshoni and Kiowa.

The combining diacritic, (Macron below) is similar to the combining low line but its mark is shorter.

Modern use
In printed documents underlining is generally avoided, with italics or small caps often used instead, or (especially in headings) using capitalization, bold type or greater body height (font size). In a manuscript to be typeset, various forms of underlining (see below) were therefore conventionally used to indicate that text should be set in special type such as italics, part of a procedure known as markup.

A series of underscores (like __ ) may be used to create a blank to be filled in by hand on a paper form. It is also sometimes used to create a horizontal line; other symbols with similar graphemes, such as hyphens and dashes, are also used for this purpose.

In German, Slovene and some other Slavic languages, the underscore has recently gained prominence as the punctuation to form gender-neutral suffixes in gendered nouns and other parts of the speech.

Usage in computing

In web browsers, default settings typically distinguish hyperlinks by underlining them (and usually changing their color), but both users and websites can change the settings to make some or all hyperlinks appear differently (or even without distinction from normal text).

History
As early output devices (Teleprinters, CRTs and line printers) could not produce more than one character at a location, it was not possible to underscore text, so early encodings such as ITA2 and the first versions of ASCII had no underscore. IBM's EBCDIC character-coding system, introduced in 1964, added the underscore, which IBM referred to as the "break character". IBM's report on NPL (the early name of what is now called PL/I) leaves the character set undefined, but specifically mentions the break character, and gives  as an example identifier. By 1967 the underscore had spread to ASCII, replacing the similarly shaped left-arrow character,  (see also: PIP). C, developed at Bell Labs in the early 1970s, allowed the underscore in identifiers.

Underscore predates the existence of lower-case letters in many systems, so often it had to be used to make multi-word identifiers, since CamelCase (see below) was not available.

Programming conventions
Underscores inserted between letters are very common to make a "multi-word" identifier in languages that cannot handle spaces in identifiers. This convention is known as "snake case" (the other popular method is called camelCase, where capital letters are used to show where the words start).

An underscore as the first character in an ID is often used to indicate an internal implementation that is not considered part of the API and should not be called by code outside that implementation. In Dart, all private properties of classes must start with an underscore; this usage is also common in other languages such as C++ even though those provide keywords to indicate that members are private. It is extensively used to hide variables and functions used for implementations in header files. In fact, the use of a single underscore for this became so common that C compilers had to standardize on a double leading underscore (for instance ) for actual built-in variables to avoid conflicts with the ones in header files. PHP "reserves all function names starting with __ as magical."

Python uses names that both start and end with double underscores for magic members used for purposes such as operator overloading and reflection, and names starting but not ending with a double underscore to denote private member variables of classes which should be mangled in a manner which prevents them from colliding with members of derived classes unless the classes have the same name ( in class  will be mangled to ). By convention, members starting with a single underscore are considered private or protected, although this behavior only has inherent effect for modules, where  statements by default import all names that do not start with an underscore, unless an export list is explicitly defined by the module.

A variable named with just an underscore often has special meaning. $_ or _ is the previous command or result in many interactive shells, such as those of Python, Ruby, and Perl. In Perl, @_ is a special array variable that holds the arguments to a function. In Clojure, it indicates an argument whose value will be ignored.

In some languages with pattern matching, such as Prolog, Standard ML, Scala, OCaml, Haskell, Erlang, and the Wolfram Language, the pattern _ matches any value, but does not perform binding.

HTML <u> and CSS 

HTML has a presentational element <u> that was originally used to underline text; this usage was deprecated in HTML4 in favor of the CSS style {text-decoration: underline}.  In HTML5, the tag reappeared but its meaning was changed significantly: it now "represents a span of inline text which should be rendered in a way that indicates that it has a non-textual annotation". This facility is intended for example to provide a red wavy line underline to flag spelling errors at input time but which are not to be embedded in any stored file (unlike an emphasis mark, which would be).

The elements may also exist in other markup languages, such as MediaWiki. The Text Encoding Initiative (TEI) provides an extensive selection of related elements for marking editorial activity (insertion, deletion, correction, addition, etc.).

Unicode
Unicode has a free-standing underscore  at U+005F, which is a legacy of the typewriter practice of underlining using backspace and overtype. Modern practice uses the combining diacritic "combining low line" at U+0332 ◌̲ that results in an underline when run together: u̲n̲d̲e̲r̲l̲i̲n̲e̲. Unicode also has the combining macron below, a single letter diacritic.
 single underline: a̲b̲c̲d̲e̲f̲g̲h̲i̲j̲k̲l̲m̲n̲o̲p̲q̲r̲s̲t̲u̲v̲w̲x̲y̲z̲0̲1̲2̲3̲4̲5̲6̲7̲8̲9̲ 
 double underline: a̲̲b̲̲c̲̲d̲̲e̲̲f̲̲g̲̲h̲̲i̲̲j̲̲k̲̲l̲̲m̲̲n̲̲o̲̲p̲̲q̲̲r̲̲s̲̲t̲̲u̲̲v̲̲w̲̲x̲̲y̲̲z̲̲0̲̲1̲̲2̲̲3̲̲4̲̲5̲̲6̲̲7̲̲8̲̲9̲̲
 single underline capitalized: A̲B̲C̲D̲E̲F̲G̲H̲I̲J̲K̲L̲M̲N̲O̲P̲Q̲R̲S̲T̲U̲V̲W̲X̲Y̲Z̲ 
 double underline capitalized: A̲̲B̲̲C̲̲D̲̲E̲̲F̲̲G̲̲H̲̲I̲̲J̲̲K̲̲L̲̲M̲̲N̲̲O̲̲P̲̲Q̲̲R̲̲S̲̲T̲̲U̲̲V̲̲W̲̲X̲̲Y̲̲Z̲̲

"Simulated" underlines in plain-text
In plain-text applications, including plain-text e-mails, where emphasis markup is not possible, the desired emphasis is often indicated by surrounding words with underscore characters. For example, "You must use an _emulsion_ paint on the ceiling".

Some applications will automatically add emphasis to text manually bracketed by underscores, either by underlining or by italicizing it (e.g.  may render  or string).

As a marker for incorrectness
Underline (typically red or wavy or both) is often used by spell checkers (and grammar checkers) to denote misspelled or otherwise incorrect text.

Manuscripts

Depending on local conventions, the following kinds of underlines may be used inline on manuscripts to indicate the special typefaces to be used:
single straight underline for italic type
single wavy underline for bold type
double straight underline for 
double underline of one straight line and one wavy line for bold italic
triple underline for FULL CAPITAL LETTERS (used among small caps or to change text already typed as lower case).

Underlines in Chinese

In Chinese, the underline is a little-used punctuation mark for proper names (pinyin: zhuānmínghào; literally "proper name mark", used for personal and geographic names). Its meaning is somewhat akin to capitalization in English and should never be used for emphasis even if the influence of English computing makes the latter sometimes occur. A wavy underline (pinyin: shūmínghào; literally, "book title mark") serves a similar function, but marks names of literary works instead of proper names.

In the case of two or more adjacent proper names, each individual proper name is separately underlined so there should be a slight gap between the underlining of each proper name.

See also
Overline
Space Character
Strikethrough
Undertie
Visible space

Notes

References

External links

 

Punctuation
Typography
Typographical symbols